Northland College is a private college in Ashland, Wisconsin. Founded as the North Wisconsin Academy in 1892, the college was established in 1906. Originally affiliated with the Congregational Church, the college remains loosely tied to the Congregational Church's descendant, the United Church of Christ. It enrolls 526 full-time undergraduates and employs 60 faculty members and 99 staff members. Northland College is accredited by the Higher Learning Commission.

History
Northland College is the successor to the North Wisconsin Academy, and was founded on the same tract of land. Wheeler Hall, built in 1892, was the North Wisconsin Academy's sole building, providing classroom space, board and cafeteria services. The building was renovated in 1993 and 1994 and remains the centerpiece of campus, housing classrooms and faculty offices for the social sciences and humanities. It is listed on the National Register of Historic Places.

Location

The college is in Ashland, Wisconsin, a small city on the shore of Lake Superior. The school is ten blocks from the lakefront. The school's location on the lakefront makes internship opportunities available with agencies such as the U.S. Fish and Wildlife Service's Ashland Fisheries Resource Office, the Whittlesey Creek National Wildlife Refuge, the Wisconsin Department of Natural Resources, and the United States Geological Survey.

Finances
As a result of concerns about the college's financial position, the Higher Learning Commission required Northland to file a financial recovery plan. The college's endowment, which incurred losses in the stock market crash of 2008-09, has since recovered and the college reported 2010-11 fund raising at the highest level in several years.

Academics
Northland College is accredited by the Higher Learning Commission.

Native American focus
The college has a relationship with the nearby Native American communities, being close to the Lac Courte Oreilles, Bad River and Red Cliff Ojibwe reservations. The college offers courses on Native American history, language and culture, and a degree in Native American studies. In August 2011, Northland College received a $163,383 grant from the Otto Bremer Foundation to establish a Native American and Indigenous Culture Center and a Council on Indigenous Relations.

Environmental focus
Each program at Northland College incorporates an emphasis on the environment and sustainability. Many classes focus on or include environmental issues.

In 1971, shortly after the first Earth Day, Northland College hosted its first environmental conference. One keynote speaker was Sigurd Olson. The college's environmental outreach arm, the Sigurd Olson Environmental Institute, opened in 1972. The institute works to educate the North country, students and community members about Great Lakes environmental issues.

Northland College is a sponsoring partner of the Chequamegon Bay Area Partnership, a coalition of 14 regional municipalities and tribal governments, state and federal agencies, and nonprofit organizations working toward the restoration of Lake Superior. Since September 2010, the partnership has won more than $1 million in competitive grants from the Great Lakes Restoration Initiative to fund habitat restoration, outreach, and education and environmental survey initiatives. This amount includes two grants totaling nearly $500,000 awarded in August 2011.

The college is also part of the Eco League, a five-college consortium that enables students to spend semesters at Alaska Pacific University, Green Mountain College, Prescott College and College of the Atlantic.

Sustainability
Northland College has been recognized by Sierra magazine, the Princeton Review, Forbes magazine, the National Arbor Day Foundation, the Sustainable Endowments Institute, and onlineuniversities.com for its commitment to sustainability and developing environmentally conscious campus initiatives. The campus has two wind turbines, five photovoltaic arrays, four hot water arrays and a geothermal heating and cooling system. Several of the campus buildings have been recognized for their environmentally friendly designs, including the McLean Environmental Living and Learning Center and the Dexter Library, which in 2010 received Leadership in Energy and Environmental Design Gold certification.

Other campus initiatives include the student-managed Renewable Energy Fund, which provides over $40,000 annually to fund campus sustainability initiatives, the Northland Bike Shoppe, which provides free-to-use bicycles for the campus community, and a robust campuswide composting program, which diverts nearly two tons of food waste from landfills each year.

Northland is an active member of several organizations focused on sustainability in higher education, including the Association for the Advancement of Sustainability in Higher Education, the Midwest Regional Collaborative for Sustainability Education, the Campus Consortium for Environmental Excellence, and the Leadership Circle of the American Colleges and Universities Presidents' Climate Commitment, which commits participating colleges to constructing buildings that meet or exceed LEED Silver certification.

Campus life
Northland's campus has 19 major buildings, and is dominated by the new student union, completed in 2003, and Wheeler Hall, built in 1892 and renovated during the 1993–1994 school year. The buildings are predominantly brick with sharply peaked roofs, in an effort to emulate the region's historical brownstone architecture. The campus centers on an open mall, a grassy area where students gather to sunbathe and play.

Two buildings on campus are listed on the National Register of Historic Places, Wheeler Hall and Wakefield Hall.

Northland's has a smoke-free campus with the exception of pre-approved Native American ceremonies.

Athletics

The school's athletic teams are called the LumberJacks and LumberJills. The school competes in NCAA Division III in all sports. It is a member of the Upper Midwest Athletic Conference and the Wisconsin Intercollegiate Athletic Conference (WIAC) for hockey. Northland was with the Northern Collegiate Hockey Association until 2019. There are 15 varsity sports. The LumberJills compete in volleyball, soccer, cross country, basketball, golf, hockey, lacrosse, and softball. The LumberJacks compete in lacrosse, soccer, cross country, basketball, hockey, golf and baseball. Nordic Skiing is offered as a club sport for both men and women.

Notable alumni
Albin C. Bro, president of Shimer College
Laurie E. Carlson, former member of the Wisconsin State Assembly
Stan Gruszynski, former member of the Wisconsin State Assembly
Barbara Linton, former member of the Wisconsin State Assembly
Beth Meyers, member of the Wisconsin State Assembly
Jamling Tenzing Norgay, Nepali Sherpa mountain climber
Sigurd F. Olson, author and environmentalist
William Plizka, former member of the Wisconsin State Assembly
Paul Feldhausen, Member of the 1968 Boston Patriots team

See also
Sigurd Olson Environmental Institute
WRNC-LP, student-owned radio station

References

External links
Official website
Official athletics website

 
Private universities and colleges in Wisconsin
Universities and colleges affiliated with the United Church of Christ
Education in Ashland County, Wisconsin
Buildings and structures in Ashland County, Wisconsin
1892 establishments in Wisconsin
Ashland, Wisconsin